The economy of Kashmir is largely a developing one. The per capita income and provincial GDP estimates of Azad Kashmir are comparatively underrated when compared with development in other regions of the country, although Azad Kashmir notably has a literacy rate that is substantially above the national average. Azad Kashmir's economy is heavily dependent on agriculture, but also relies on remittances sent each year by the members of the large Kashmiri diaspora. The Kashmiri diaspora in the United Kingdom have contributed greatly to the development of Azad Kashmir through their in-flow of remittances. In the southern districts, many men have been recruited into the Pakistani Armed Forces. Other locals travel to countries in Europe or the Middle East where they work in labour-oriented jobs. The local tourism industry has potential although is underdeveloped.

Challenges faced by Azad Kashmir's economy include the devastating 2005 Kashmir earthquake, the effects of which the region is still recovering from.

As of 2022, GDP of Azad Jammu and Kashmir was estimated to be  , giving per capita income of 1512 dollar USD, above from in Sept 2013, when Azad Kashmir's GDP was estimated at $3.2 Billion.

References

{Hari}

 
Azad